The Kategoria Superiore Fair Play Award is an annual award in Albania given to the most fair play player of the Kategoria Superiore by association "Sporti Na Bashkon". This award was established in the 2009–10 season.

Winners

Number of awards per player

See also
Kategoria Superiore Player of the Month

References
 

Footballers in Albania
Albanian awards
Annual events in Albania
Association football player non-biographical articles